Android Eclair is a codename of the Android mobile operating system developed by Google, the fifth operating system for Android and the second major release of Android. Eclair spans the versions 2.0.x and 2.1. Unveiled on October 26, 2009, Android Eclair builds upon the significant changes made in Android 1.6 "Android Donut". The first phone with Android Eclair is Nexus One. Google ceased Android Market support for Android Eclair on June 31, 2017.

Features

User experience 
The default home screen of Eclair displays a persistent Google Search bar across the top of the screen. The camera app was also redesigned with numerous new camera features, including flash support, digital zoom, scene mode, white balance, color effect and macro focus. The photo gallery app also contains basic photo editing tools. This version also included the addition of live wallpapers, allowing the animation of home-screen background images to show movement. Speech-to-text was first introduced, replacing the comma key.

Platform 
Android Eclair inherits platform additions from the Donut release, including the ability to search all saved SMS and MMS messages, improved Google Maps 3.1.2, and Exchange support for the Email app. The operating system also provides improved typing speed on virtual keyboard, along with new accessibility, calendar, and virtual private network APIs. For internet browsing, Android Eclair also adds support for HTML5, refreshed browser UI with bookmark thumbnails and double-tap zoom.

See also 
 Android version history
 iPhone OS 3
 Windows Mobile 6.5
 Windows 7
 Mac OS X Snow Leopard

References

External links 
 
 

Android (operating system)
2009 software